The Listowel Cyclones are a junior ice hockey team based in Listowel, Ontario, Canada.  They play in the Mid-Western division of the Greater Ontario Junior Hockey League. They currently play at the Steve Kerr Memorial Complex.

History and The Early Years
The Listowel Cyclones were named after famous local professional hockey player Fred "Cyclone" Taylor.

Founded in 1972, the team started out in the Central Junior C Hockey League, but moved up to Midwestern "B" in 1979.  The team had horrible results in the '80s, sometimes going for months without a single victory.  The '90s were decent to the Cyclones, but by 1999 the team fell into some bad years.  The Cyclones had their coming out party in 2005 though, winning the league championship for the first time in history to earn the right to compete for the Sutherland Cup, another team first.

Despite never truly being a contender, the team has had moments of greatness and weakness.  On one hand, the Cyclones hold the record for the worst defeat in Mid-Western "B" history: a 23–3 loss to the Waterloo Siskins on December 11, 1983.  On the other hand, the team came out of nowhere to win the league title in 2005.  Another record they set that year, as the 7th seed in the playoffs, was the lowest entry seed in league history to win the championship.  Listowel came in third in the Sutherland Cup Round Robin, losing out to the Chatham Maroons and the eventual champion Thorold Blackhawks.

The Modern Years
After a franchise best of 33 wins in 2015–2016 (this record was broken the following year in the 2016-2017 season), the Listowel Cyclones were swept 4–0 by the 6th seed Waterloo Siskins in the GOJHL playoffs. Waterloo went on to upset the Kitchener Dutchmen in the second round but lost in the final of the Cherrey Cup to the Stratford Cullitons.

The 2016–2017 roster was composed of several returning players and OHL training camps invitees including Jackob Lee (11th round, Guelph Storm), Holdyn Lansink (12th round, Erie Otters), Brock Baier (10th round, Windsor Spitfires), Chet Phillips (4th round, Saginaw Spirit), Brendan Cederberg (11th round, Peterborough Petes) and Ben Derrough (Owen Sound Attack). The key losses for the team this year is last year's starting goalie Tyler Fassl and their leading scorer from last year Jamie Huber. Tyler Fassl has moved on to the OJHL's Trenton Goldenhawks, defensemen Kade Landry is now with the OHL's Barrie Colts, Jordan Caskenette is with Walkerton Hawks (Jr.C), defensemen Scott Pederson is now playing in the CIS for Laurentian University and 2015-2016 leading scorer Jamie Huber has moved on to the Prince George Spruce Kings of the BCHL. Other notable losses from the 2015-2016 team that were key players in Listowel's record winning season include Tim Nauta, Ben Shelley, Ray McFalls, Corey Flemington and Austin Huizenga.  The 2016–2017 team co-captains are veteran locals Caleb Warren and Blake Nichol. The team will also have alternating away and home assistant captains. Alternate captains include Riley Robertson, Keaton Willis, Brady Anderson and Holdyn Lansink. Midway through the season, the team added former Cyclone Ben VanOotegham from the Pembroke Lumberkings of the CCHL. VanOotegham previously played for the Listowel Cyclones in 2013-2014 and 2014-2015 seasons. Halfway through the 2016-2017 GOJHL season the Cyclones were in 1st place in the Midwestern division and look to break last year's franchise win record with a 20–2–2 start.  On December 8, 2016, last year's leading scorer Jamie Huber returned from the BCHL to rejoin the team in their record setting season. Along with Huber, the Cyclones added more offensive power by welcoming 3 year OHL veteran and Exeter native Cullen Mercer to the line up on Jan 7th, 2017.

The Listowel Cyclones began the 2017- 2018 season playing at the Listowel Memorial Arena. On Saturday December 9, 2017, the Cyclones played their first game in the new Steve Kerr Memorial Complex against the Statford Warriors. They defeated the Stratford Warriors 7-2 in front of 1,503 fans. Jakob Lee scored the first goal in the new building at 5:18 of the 1st period.

After a tremendous 2016-2017 and 2017-2018 season the Listowel Cyclones experienced many changes. The Cyclones lost several over-age players that played an integral role in the teams Cherrey Cup and Sutherland Cup championship season such as Blake Nichol, Caleb Warren, Cullen Mercer, Ben VanOtegham, Keaton Willis, Brady Anderson, Brett Primeau, Tommy Hoogars and Garrett Russell. Several players also moved up the junior hockey ranks to others teams, including goalie Max Wright (Brooks Bandits, AJHL), Max Coyle (Prince George Spruce Kings, BCHL), Jakob Lee (Brooks Bandits, AJHL), Mitch Deelstra (Alberni Valley Bulldogs, BCHL) and Danny Skinner (Lasalle Vipers, GOJHL).

Season records
On February 12, 2017 the Listowel Cyclones broke their franchise single season wins record with a convincing 34th win over the Elmira Sugar Kings (6-3) and reclaimed sole possession of 1st place in the midwestern conference of the GOJHL. They previously set the single season franchise record last year with 33 wins. What has turned out to be a season of firsts, on February 23, 2017, the Listowel Cyclones defeated the Cambridge Winterhawks 4–0 and are the first Jr. B Listowel Cyclone team in 38 years and franchise history to clinch 1st place in the midwestern conference of the GOJHL 

On February 19, 2018, the Cyclones broke their single season record of wins (40) again with a 2-1 win over their rivals the Statford Warriors. They then defeated the Brantford 99ers 4 days later 5-1 and have set the franchise record for season wins at 42.

2017 Cherrey Cup Champions

The Cyclones began the 2017 playoffs by facing the 8th seed the Brantford 99ers in the conference quarterfinals and defeated the 99ers with 4 straight wins to win the series 4–0. In the next round the Cyclones faced off against the Waterloo Siskins. This series was especially sentimental for cyclone players who were part of the team last year that was swept in heart breaking fashion (4–0). The Cyclones won the first 2 games in convincing fashion, 6–0 and 7–1. The Cyclones won game #3 3–2 in overtime with Jamie Huber scoring the overtime winner. [16] On March 22, 2017 the Cyclones defeated the Siskins 6–2 in Waterloo, completing the sweep and won some redemption after last year's sweep in Waterloo on March 9, 2016. The game was marked by Cullen Mercer scoring 4 goals in eight minutes in the second period. [17] CTV news Kitchener referred to Mercer as the "one man cyclone" after his 4 goal performance. The Listowel Cyclones advanced to the Cherrey Cup finals for the first time since 2011. [18]

After losing the first two games of the series to the Elmira Sugar Kings (3–2 OT and 3–2), the Listowel Cyclones rallied back to win 4 straight games and win the Cherrey Cup on April 9, 2017. This was the franchise's second Cherrey Cup win, the other being in 2004–05.

2018 Cherrey Cup Champions

The Cyclones began the 2018 playoffs facing the 8th seed Guelph Hurricanes. The Cyclones swept the Guelph Hurricanes 4-0. The Cyclones then faced the 4th seed Waterloo Siskins in the second round. This series was a true test for the Cyclones that went 7 games with Listowel Cyclones defeating the Waterloo Siskins 4-3 on March 26, 2018 with AP player Trent Verbeek scoring the game winning goal. After defeating the Siskins in dramatic fashion while facing several injuries the Cyclones defended their Cherrey cup championship against the Elmira Sugar Kings; defeating them in the final for the second straight year. The Cyclones rallied around their previous round adversity and defeated the Elmira Sugar Kings 4-0 and won their 3rd franchise Cherrey Cup on April 4, 2018. The Cyclones faced the London Nationals again in the first round of the Sutherland Cup and Elmira clinched the wildcard spot in the Sutherland Cup and played the Caledonia Corvairs; both being repeat 1st round match-ups from last year's Sutherland Cup.

2017 Sutherland Cup
The Listowel Cyclones began the Sutherland Cup semi-finals as the 1st ranked team and faced the Western Conference champions London Nationals. On Friday April 21, 2017, the London Nationals defeated the Listowel Cyclones 3–2 in game 5 in a heart breaking overtime win, defeating the Cyclones 4–1 in the series. Although it wasn't the ideal result of the season there is a lot to be proud of including a midwestern conference 1st place finish (first in team history), a Cherrey cup championship (only 2nd championship in 37 years) and several players from this years team can return next year.

2018 Sutherland Cup Champions
The Listowel Cyclones started the Sutherland Cup semi-finals as the 3rd-ranked team and faced the Golden Horseshoe Champions Caledonia Pro Fit Corvairs in the finals after defeating the London Nationals 4-2 in the semi-finals. On Tuesday May 1, 2018, the Listowel Cyclones defeated the Caledonia Pro Fit Corvairs and completed the 4-game sweep (4–3, 6–3, 2–1, 4–1) to earn the organization's first-ever Junior B Sutherland Cup Championship.

2018–2019 season

After winning the Sutherland Cup and Cherrey Cup in the 2017–2018 and losing a lot of players many thought the 2018–2019 season would be a rebuilding year. The 2018–2019 season was anything but a hangover season as many expected. The Cyclones exceeded expectations with only a handful of returning players from the 2018 championship team. Led by co-captains Holdyn Lansink and Chayse Herrfort the Cyclones completed the 2018–2019 regular season in first place for the third time to retain their regular season championship. However, the Cyclones were not able to retain their Cherrey Cup championship as they lost in the Cherrey Cup final to the Waterloo Siskins 4 games to 2. Luckily after being eliminated the Cyclones qualified as the Wild Card team for the Sutherland but lost to the London Nationals in the semifinal 4 games to 2.

The 2018–2019 season also saw two of their leaders hit the record books. Chayse Herrfort broke Ben Shelley's record (237 games) for most franchise games played with 244 games. Holdyn Lansink also set the franchise record for most points, goals and assists in a single season (48 games- 46 goals- 65 assists- 111 points). Lansink also set the franchise record for all-time goals, assists and points (120 goals- 170 assists-290 points). Lansink's impressive record breaking season also earned the OHA Jr B player of the year award.

The 2018–2019 season was also a special season as it was Jason Brooks' last season as head coach of the Cyclones. Over the 5 years, Brooks has led the team to 170 season wins, 3 Midwestern conference season championships, 3 Cherrey Cup appearances, 2 Cherrey Cup championships, 3 Sutherland Cup appearances and the franchise's first-ever Sutherland Cup Championship in 2018. Brooks is credited for developing the Cyclones program into a reputable Junior B organization. It was announced following the 2018–2019 season that assistant coach Jeese Cole would become the new head coach for the 2019–2020 season.

Current staff 

2019–2020 Staff:

 Jesse Cole: General Manager/Head Coach
 Brett Nichol: Assistant Coach
 Brady Anderson: Assistant Coach
 Jeff Goldie: Assistant Coach
 Dr. Brent Milljour: Trainer/Chiropractor
 Mark Kennedy: Equipment Manager
 Wayne Long: President
 Randy Petrie: Assistant General Manager
 Jason Brooks: Hockey Operations
 Brad Haines: Vice President
 Jenesta Davidson: Vice President
 Matt Fischer: Strength and Conditioning Coach
 Team Chapel Leader: John Farnworth
 Billet Coordinator: Rick Cameron
 Videographers: Nick Townsend 
The team also has a strong and committed group of game-day volunteers, executive members, scouts and other support staff that play an integral role in the team's day-to-day operations and the continued success of the hockey club.

Season-by-season record

Championships
Cherrey Cup Midwestern Champions: 2005, 2017, 2018
Midwestern Conference Regular Season Champions: 2016-17, 2017–18,2018-2019
Sutherland Cup GOJHL Champions: 2018

Sutherland Cup appearances
2017: Listowel Cyclones lost to London Nationals  4-games-to-1 in Semifinals
2018: Listowel Cyclones defeated London Nationals  4-games-to-2 in Semifinals  and defeated Caledonia Corvairs 4-games-to-0 in Sutherland Cup Final
2019: Listowel Cyclones lost to London Nationals  4-games-to-2 in Semifinals

Notable alumni
Jeff Bloemberg
Dwayne Hay
Brett MacLean
Tye McGinn
Nick Spaling
Jared Keeso

References

External links
Cyclones Webpage
GOJHL Webpage

Ice hockey teams in Ontario